State assembly elections were held in Malaysia on 29 November 1999 in all states except Sabah and Sarawak. The elections were held alongside general elections, and saw the opposition win a total of 113 seats, 98 of which went to the Pan-Malaysian Islamic Party (PAS), 11 to the Democratic Action Party (DAP) and 4 for the People's Justice Party. In the states of  Kelantan and Terengganu, the PAS won by a huge margin–41-2 against Barisan Nasional and 28-4 respectively–hence allowing them to form the state governments in these states. In addition, the PAS also captured one-third of the seats in Kedah, with the remaining two-thirds going to Barisan Nasional (United Malays National Organisation won 16 seats and the Malaysian Chinese Association 2).

The election results were seen as a great gain for PAS, who previously had no state seats in Kedah and capturing only one seat in Terengganu in the 1995 elections. Observers attributed this to the neglect by the Federal Administration in the states of Terengganu and Kelantan.

Sabah held its state assembly election earlier on 12 – 13 March 1999.

Results

Perlis

Kedah

Kelantan

Terengganu

Penang

Perak

Pahang

Selangor

Negeri Sembilan

Malacca

Johor

Sabah

References 

State elections in Malaysia
state